Seven Winds is a 1962 Soviet drama film directed by Stanislav Rostotsky.

Plot 
The film tells about a girl named Svetlana who goes to another city to meet her fiance Igor, but as a result of the war they did not meet and Svetlana began to wait for him. When the Nazis approached the city, the new home of Svetlana became a hospital, and she became a fighter.

Cast 
 Larisa Luzhina as Svetlana Ivashova
 Sofiya Pilyavskaya
 Vyacheslav Tikhonov as Capt. Suzdalev
 Klara Luchko as Doctor Natalia Guseva
 Vladimir Zamanskiy	
 Vyacheslav Nevinnyy
 Mikhail Troyanovskiy as Waldemar Yanovich Peterson
 Margarita Strunova

References

External links 
 

1962 films
1960s Russian-language films
Soviet drama films
1962 drama films